The ISU Speed Skating World Cup is a series of international speed skating competitions, organised annually by the International Skating Union since the winter of 1985–86. Every year during the winter season, a number of competitions on different distances and on different locations are held. Skaters can earn points at each competition, and the skater who has the most points on a given distance at the end of the series is the winner. Initially not very popular with skaters nor spectators, the World Cup has gradually become more and more popular, and this was due to the creation of the World Single Distance Championships. The results of the separate distances in the World Cup ranking are the main qualifying method for the World Single Distance Championships.

The number of races per season per distance varies, but it is usually between five and ten. Ten World Cup titles are awarded every season, five for men (the 500 m, the 1000 m, the 1500 m, the combined 5000 m / 10000 m, and the team pursuit), and five for women (the 500 m, the 1000 m, the 1500 m, the combined 3000 m / 5000 m, and the team pursuit).

The team pursuit was added to the World Cup in the 2005–06 season. Between the seasons 2003–04 and 2008–09, the 100 m was also contested for men and women, but this category is now defunct.

The mass start was re-introduced for both women and men in the World Cup in Astana in 2011.

Overall World Cup winners

Men

Source: SpeedSkatingStats.com

Medals:

Women

Source: SpeedSkatingStats.com
Medals:

Most World Cup victories
The skaters with the highest number of individual World Cup victories as of 9 February 2020. Active skaters in bold.

Men

Source: SpeedSkatingStats.com

Women

Source: SpeedSkatingStats.com

All-time medal count

See also 
 ISU Junior World Cup Speed Skating
Cup Ranking - Country Medal Table 
World Speed Skating Championships

References

 
International speed skating competitions
Recurring sporting events established in 1985
Speed skating
International Skating Union competitions